Skywalker Sound is the American sound effects, sound editing, sound design, sound mixing and music recording division of Lucasfilm. Founded in 1975, the company's main facilities are located at George Lucas's Skywalker Ranch in Lucas Valley, near Nicasio, California.

History 
Skywalker Sound was founded as Sprocket Systems in San Anselmo, California.

While located in San Anselmo, Sprocket Systems came into contact with the local residents from time to time. For instance, Kentfield resident Pat Welsh was "discovered" while shopping at a camera store and went on to provide the voice for E.T. During the sound recording of Raiders of the Lost Ark, Harrison Ford could be spotted practicing his bullwhip technique in the parking lot.

Sprocket Systems moved from San Anselmo following a disastrous flood in January 1982. The company changed its name to Skywalker Sound in 1987 after the company moved to Skywalker Ranch.

Skywalker Sound's staff of sound designers and re-recording mixers have either won or been nominated for an Academy Award for Best Sound and Best Sound Editing every year since Star Wars in 1977; in that year, Ben Burtt was given a Special Achievement Award, since the category for Sound Editing had not yet been established. Skywalker Sound has won 15 Academy Awards and received 62 nominations.

Mixing stages, editorial services, and scoring stages are all located in a central "Tech Building," with dining areas and living quarters in the vicinity but separate from the main work area.

In 2012, The Walt Disney Company acquired Skywalker Sound as part of its purchase of Lucasfilm.

Notable staff 

 David Acord
 Christopher Barnett
 Richard Beggs
 Tom Bellfort
 Steve Boeddeker
 Christopher Boyes
 Ben Burtt
 Bob Edwards
 Frank Eulner
 Andre Fenley
 Lora Hirschberg
 Richard Hymns
 Leslie Ann Jones
 Ren Klyce
 Dennis Leonard
 Michael Levine
 Scott Levine
 Tom Myers
 Steve Orlando
 Gary A. Rizzo
 Gary Rydstrom
 Chris Scarabosio
 Michael Semanick
 Michael Silvers
 Mac Smith
 Gary Summers
 Randy Thom
 Gwendolyn Yates Whittle
 Matthew Wood

Partial filmography 
Any film with an asterisk means that though Skywalker Sound did not provide the sound, a creative worked on it.

1970s 
 Star Wars (1977)
 More American Graffiti (1979)

1980s 

 The Empire Strikes Back (1980)
 Raiders of the Lost Ark (1981)
 E.T. the Extra-Terrestrial (1982)
 Koyaanisqatsi (1982)
 Return of the Jedi (1983)
 Twice Upon a Time (1983)
 Indiana Jones and the Temple of Doom (1984)
 The Adventures of André and Wally B. (1984)
 Grand Canyon: The Hidden Secrets (1984)
 Cocoon (1985)
 Latino (1985)
 The Legend of Billie Jean (1985)
 Mishima: A Life in Four Chapters (1985)
 Remo Williams: The Adventure Begins (1985)
 The Mean Season (1985)
 Fletch (1985)
 Explorers (1985)
 Luxo, Jr. (1986)
 Howard the Duck (1986)
 Captain EO (1986)
 Red's Dream (1987)
 Spaceballs (1987)
 The Brave Little Toaster (1987)
 Willow (1988)
 Tin Toy (1988)
 Technological Threat (1988)
 The Couch Trip (1988)
 Powaqqatsi (1988)
 Tucker: The Man and His Dream (1988)
 The Land Before Time (1988)
 Colors (1988)
 Cocoon: The Return (1988)
 Always (1989)
 Knick Knack (1989)
 Romeo (1989)
 Indiana Jones and the Last Crusade (1989)
 Fletch Lives (1989)
 Driving Miss Daisy (1989)

1990s 

 Cold Dog Soup (1990)
 Henry & June (1990)
 The Godfather Part III (1990)
 Wild at Heart (1990)
 Avalon (1990)
 Backdraft (1991)
 Terminator 2: Judgment Day (1991)
 Soapdish (1991)
 Rush (1991)
 Bugsy (1991)
 The Five Heartbeats (1991)
 A Brief History of Time (1991)
 A Few Good Men (1992)
 Single White Female (1992)
 The Muppet Christmas Carol (1992)
 FernGully: The Last Rainforest (1992)
 The Young Indiana Jones Chronicles (1992-1993)
 JoJo's Bizarre Adventure (OVA) (1993-1994)
 Mrs. Doubtfire (1993)
 Jurassic Park (1993)
 Super Mario Bros. (1993)
 True Romance (1993)
 Thumbelina (1994)
 Forrest Gump (1994)
 Baby's Day Out (1994)
 Radioland Murders (1994)
 The Crow (1994)
 Speed (1994)
 A Troll in Central Park (1994)
 Home for the Holidays (1995)
 The Pebble and the Penguin (1995) (as Skywalker Sound South)
 Se7en (1995)
 Under Siege 2: Dark Territory (1995)
 Gumby: The Movie (1995)
 Strange Days (1995)
 My Family (1995)
 Toy Story (1995)
 Jumanji (1995)
 Broken Arrow (1996)
 Mission: Impossible (1996)
 Mars Attacks! (1996)
 Muppet Treasure Island (1996)
 The Rock (1996)
 James and the Giant Peach (1996)
 Con Air (1997)
 Contact (1997)
 Geri's Game (1997)
 Speed 2: Cruise Control (1997)
 Starship Troopers (1997)
 Hercules (1997)
 Titanic (1997)
 Volcano (1997)
 A Bug's Life (1998)
 Saving Private Ryan (1998)
 Armageddon (1998)
 Quest for Camelot (1998)
 Star Wars: Episode I – The Phantom Menace (1999)
 The Iron Giant (1999)
 The 13th Warrior (1999)
 Toy Story 2 (1999)
 Bicentennial Man (1999)
 Fight Club (1999)
 Office Space (1999)

2000s 

 Titan A.E. (2000)
 For the Birds (2000)
 Dinosaur (2000)
 What Lies Beneath (2000)
 Cast Away (2000)
 102 Dalmatians (2000)
 Aqua Teen Hunger Force (2009-12)
 Spy Kids (2001)
 Atlantis: The Lost Empire (2001)
 Osmosis Jones (2001)
 Jay and Silent Bob Strike Back (2001)
 Pearl Harbor (2001)
 A.I. Artificial Intelligence (2001)
 Final Fantasy: The Spirits Within (2001)
 Jurassic Park III (2001)
 Monkeybone (2001)
 Monsters, Inc. (2001)
 JoJo's Bizarre Adventure (OVA) (2000–2002)
 Punch-Drunk Love (2002)
 Minority Report (2002)
 Harry Potter and the Chamber of Secrets (2002)
 The Ring (2002)
 Hart's War (2002)
 The Emperor's Club (2002)
 Lilo & Stitch (2002)
 Mike's New Car (2002)
 Panic Room (2002)
 Star Wars: Episode II – Attack of the Clones (2002)
 Spy Kids 2: The Island of Lost Dreams (2002)
 Adaptation (2002)
 Boundin' (2003)
 Daredevil (2003)
 Finding Nemo (2003)
 Mickey's PhilharMagic (2003)
 Hulk (2003)
 Star Wars: Clone Wars (2003–2005)
 Pirates of the Caribbean: The Curse of the Black Pearl (2003)
 Peter Pan (2003)
 Shrek 2 (2004)
 The Incredibles (2004)
 The Polar Express (2004)
 Howl's Moving Castle (2004)
 Ghost in the Shell 2: Innocence (2004)
 Star Wars: Episode III – Revenge of the Sith (2005)
 War of the Worlds (2005)
 Charlie and the Chocolate Factory (2005)
 Feast (2005)
 Jack-Jack Attack (2005)
 Munich (2005)
 Lorelei: The Witch of the Pacific Ocean (2005)
 Harry Potter and the Goblet of Fire (2005)
 One Man Band (2005)
 King Kong (2005)
 Hoodwinked! (2005)
 Cars (2006)
 Monster House (2006)
 Lifted (2006)
 Mater and the Ghostlight (2006)
 Perfume: The Story of a Murderer (2006)
 Charlotte's Web (2006)
 Pirates of the Caribbean: Dead Man's Chest (2006)
 Clerks II (2006)
 Zoom (2006)
 Ice Age: The Meltdown (2006)
 Over the Hedge (2006)
 Eragon (2006)
 Brave Story (2006)
 Mission Impossible III (2006)
 Lady in the Water (2006)
 Talladega Nights (2006)
 Barnyard (2006; Score Recorded and Mixed at)
 Ratatouille (2007)
 Transformers (2007)
 Pirates of the Caribbean: At World's End (2007)
 The Simpsons Movie (2007)
 Bee Movie (2007)
 Enchanted (2007)
 Beowulf (2007)
 Happily N'Ever After (2007)
 The Kite Runner (2007)
 Aqua Teen Hunger Force Colon Movie Film for Theaters (2007)
 Your Friend the Rat (2007)
 Cloverfield (2008)
 Dead Space (2008; Score Recorded at)
 WALL-E (2008)
 Hellboy II: The Golden Army (2008)
 Star Wars: The Clone Wars (2008)
 The Sky Crawlers (2008)
 Bolt (2008)
 Indiana Jones and the Kingdom of the Crystal Skull (2008)
 Star Wars: The Clone Wars (2008–2014, 2020)
 Horton Hears a Who! (2008)
 Shaolin Girl (2008)
 Iron Man (2008)
 Zack and Miri Make a Porno (2008)
 Madagascar: Escape 2 Africa (2008)
 Presto (2008)
 The Curious Case of Benjamin Button (2008)
 BURN-E (2008)
 Up (2009)
 Harry Potter and the Half-Blood Prince (2009)
 Avatar (2009)
 A Christmas Carol (2009)
 Terminator Salvation (2009)
 Ice Age: Dawn of the Dinosaurs (2009)
 Coraline (2009)
 Fanboys (2009)
 I Love You, Beth Cooper (2009)
 9 (2009)
 Dug's Special Mission (2009)

2010s 

 Iron Man 2 (2010)
 Percy Jackson & the Olympians: The Lightning Thief (2010)
 Despicable Me (2010)
 How to Train Your Dragon (2010)
 Toy Story 3 (2010)
 The Last Airbender (2010)
 Tron: Legacy (2010)
 Mars Needs Moms (2011)
 Rango (2011)
 Rio (2011)
 Super 8 (2011)
 La Luna (2011)
 Cars 2 (2011)
 Pirates of the Caribbean: On Stranger Tides (2011)
 Dead Space 2 (2011; Score Recorded at)
 Cowboys & Aliens (2011)
 The Adventures of Tintin (2011)
 War Horse (2011)
 The Lorax (2012)
 ParaNorman (2012)
 Brave (2012)
 The Avengers (2012)
 Ice Age: Continental Drift (2012)
 The Odd Life of Timothy Green (2012)
 Madagascar 3: Europe's Most Wanted (2012)
 Flight (2012)
 Red Tails (2012)
 Wreck-It Ralph (2012)
 House of Cards (2013–2018)
 The Croods (2013)
 Epic (2013)
 Despicable Me 2 (2013)
 Monsters University (2013)
 The Lone Ranger (2013)
 Iron Man 3 (2013)
 Free Birds (2013)
 Thor: The Dark World (2013)
 Nymphomaniac (2013)
 Dawn of the Planet of the Apes (2014)
 Rio 2 (2014)
 The Boxtrolls (2014)
 Gone Girl (2014)
 Maleficent (2014)
 Captain America: The Winter Soldier (2014)
 How to Train Your Dragon 2 (2014)
 Lava (2014)
 Lucy (2014)
 Guardians of the Galaxy (2014)
 Big Hero 6 (2014)
 Strange Magic (2015)
 Home (2015)
 The Divergent Series: Insurgent (2015)
 The Little Prince (2015)
 Sanjay's Super Team (2015)
 Inside Out (2015)
 Tomorrowland (2015)
 Avengers: Age of Ultron (2015)
 The Peanuts Movie (2015)
 Jurassic World (2015)
 Minions (2015)
 Bridge of Spies (2015)
 Ant-Man (2015)
 Creed (2015)
 The Good Dinosaur (2015)
 The Walk (2015)
 Star Wars: The Force Awakens (2015)
 The Revenant (2015)
 Pixels (2015)
 The Divergent Series: Allegiant (2016)
 Finding Dory (2016)
 Captain America: Civil War (2016)
 Ice Age: Collision Course (2016)
 The Jungle Book (2016)
 The Secret Life of Pets (2016)
 Zootopia (2016)
 The Angry Birds Movie (2016)
 The BFG (2016)
 Life, Animated (2016)
 Pete's Dragon (2016)
 Mars (2016–present)
 Moana (2016)
 Doctor Strange (2016)
 Sing (2016)
 Rogue One (2016)
 Native (2016)
 Monster Trucks (2017)
 A Cure for Wellness  (2017)
 Lou (2017)
 Kong: Skull Island (2017)
 Guardians of the Galaxy Vol. 2 (2017)
 War for the Planet of the Apes (2017)
 Pirates of the Caribbean: Dead Men Tell No Tales (2017)
 Cars 3 (2017)
 Despicable Me 3 (2017)
 Star Wars Forces of Destiny (2017-2018)
 Only the Brave (2017)
 Mindhunter (2017)
 Thor: Ragnarok (2017)
 Coco (2017)
 Ferdinand (2017)
 Star Wars: The Last Jedi (2017)
 The Post (2017)
 Phantom Thread (2017)
 Black Panther (2018)
 A Wrinkle in Time (2018)
 Ready Player One (2018)
 Avengers: Infinity War (2018)
 Bao (2018)
 Solo: A Star Wars Story (2018)
 Won't You Be My Neighbor? (2018)
 Incredibles 2 (2018)
 Jurassic World: Fallen Kingdom (2018)
 Ant-Man and the Wasp (2018)
 The Front Runner (2018)
 Next Gen (2018)
 The Old Man & the Gun (2018)
 High Life (2018)
 The Grinch (2018)
 Ralph Breaks the Internet (2018)
 Vice (2018)
 How to Train Your Dragon: The Hidden World (2019)
 Io (2019)
 Alita: Battle Angel (2019)
 The Last Black Man in San Francisco (2019)
 Triple Frontier (2019)
 Captain Marvel (2019)
 Unicorn Store (2019)
 Avengers: Endgame (2019)
 Bolden (2019)
 A Hidden Life (2019)
 Brightburn (2019)
 The Secret Life of Pets 2 (2019)
 Toy Story 4 (2019)
 The Lion King (2019)
 Haunt (2019)
 The Angry Birds Movie 2 (2019)
 The Dark Crystal: Age of Resistance (2019)
 Ad Astra (2019)
 Knives Out (2019)
 Star Wars: The Rise of Skywalker (2019)
 Frozen II (2019)
 Spies in Disguise (2019)

2020s 

 Dolittle (2020)
 Onward (2020)
 The Willoughbys (2020)
 The SpongeBob Movie: Sponge on the Run (2020)
 Mulan (2020)
 Over the Moon (2020)
 The Croods: A New Age (2020)
 Soul (2020)
 Minari (2020)
 Raya and the Last Dragon (2021)
 Wish Dragon (2021)
 22 vs. Earth (2021)
 Luca (2021)
 Shang-Chi and the Legend of the Ten Rings  (2021)
 The Green Knight  (2021)
 The French Dispatch (2021)
 The Suicide Squad  (2021)
 Vivo (2021)
 Black Widow (2021)
 Eternals (2021)
 Ciao Alberto (2021)
 Licorice Pizza (2021)
 Encanto (2021)
 West Side Story (2021)
 Don't Look Up (2021)
 Sing 2 (2021)
 Riverdance: The Animated Adventure (2022)
 Turning Red (2022)
 The Ice Age Adventures of Buck Wild (2022)
 Moon Knight (2022)
 Doctor Strange in the Multiverse of Madness (2022)
 Chip 'n Dale: Rescue Rangers (2022)
 Top Gun: Maverick (2022)
 Jurassic World Dominion (2022)
 Lightyear (2022)
 Minions: The Rise of Gru (2022)
 Thor: Love and Thunder (2022)
 Paws of Fury: The Legend of Hank (2022)
 Luck (2022)
 She-Hulk: Attorney at Law (2022)
 Cars on the Road (2022)
 Pinocchio (2022)
 Wendell & Wild (2022)
 Argentina, 1985 (2022)
 Black Panther: Wakanda Forever (2022)
 The Fabelmans (2022)
 Glass Onion: A Knives Out Mystery (2022)
 Strange World (2022)
 White Noise (2022)
 Avatar: The Way of Water (2022)
 Ant-Man and the Wasp: Quantumania (2023)

Upcoming 
 Hitpig (2023)
 The Super Mario Bros. Movie (2023)
 Guardians of the Galaxy Vol. 3 (2023)
 Elemental (2023)
 Indiana Jones and the Dial of Destiny (2023)
 The Marvels (2023)
 Blade (2024)

References

External links 
 
 Skywalker Sound Blog (unofficial)
 

1975 establishments in California
American companies established in 1975
Mass media companies established in 1975
Film sound production
Disney acquisitions
Lucasfilm
George Lucas
Companies based in Marin County, California
Television and film post-production companies